North Branch Area High School is a four-year public high school located in North Branch, Minnesota, United States. The school was founded in 1932.

Extra-curricular and co-curricular activities 

North Branch Area High School offers a few co-curricular and extra-curricular programs in the arts. Their theatre program, has put on several productions, notably 2019's One-Act Play Through the Looking Glass which won first place at subsections, and first place at sections. Making them the 7AA Section Champion for the first time in 15 years.

 Concert Band
 Symphonic Band
 Concert Choir
 Fall Play
 One-Act Play
 Spring Musical
 Speech
 Knowledge Bowl
 Math League
 Air Force JROTC
 DECA
 Prostart
 Robotics

Sports 
North Branch Area High School is a member of the Mississippi 8 conference which includes the Chisago Lakes Wildcats, Monticello Magic, North Branch Vikings, Buffalo Bison, Princeton Tigers, The Cambridge-Isanti Bluejackets, Rogers Royals, Big Lake Hornets, St. Michael - Albertville Knights, and the St. Francis Saints.

Fall
Cross Country
Football
Soccer-Boys
Soccer-Girls
Tennis
Volleyball
Winter
Basketball-Boys
Basketball-Girls
Gymnastics
Hockey-Boys
Hockey-Girls
Wrestling
Spring
Baseball
Softball
Golf

Clubs 
 National Honor Society
 Peer Leadership
 Student Council
 Tech Club
 Science Club
 Business in Action
 Yearbook

References

External links
 
 Independent School District 138

Educational institutions established in 1932
Public high schools in Minnesota
Schools in Chisago County, Minnesota
1932 establishments in Minnesota